Davey Jay Hamilton Jr. (born March 15, 1997) is an American racing driver from Idaho who competes in pavement sprint car racing. He is the son of former Indianapolis 500 competitor Davey Hamilton.

Hamilton has raced mainly midgets, sprint cars, and in the Stadium Super Trucks. He made his Indy Lights debut in 2016.

Racing career
Hamilton started his racing career in karting at his local karttrack near Star, Idaho. The third generation racing driver made his debut in the USAC Midgets. In 2011 Hamilton finished eleventh in the Ford Focus Midwestern Pavement division. For 2012, Hamilton improved to a sixth place in the series.

In 2015, Hamilton won the King of the Wing's Western Sprintcar Series. Hamilton began testing an Indy Lights car with McCormack Racing in 2015. It was initially announced that he would compete in the full 2016 Indy Lights season with the team but the entry did not materialize until the season finale at Mazda Raceway Laguna Seca where Hamilton finally made his series debut. He won the King of the Wing championship in 2016.

In 2017, Hamilton joined the Stadium Super Trucks, racing Always Evolving's No. 75 at the Grand Prix of St. Petersburg. At the Beijing National Stadium round, Hamilton won the race, but did not take the joker lane and was disqualified. He also drove in one NASCAR K&N Pro Series West late that year.

On April 30, 2018, after a rookie test at Kentucky Speedway, Team Pelfrey announced that Hamilton would be competing in that year's Freedom 100 at Indianapolis Motor Speedway, and that they were working to add more appearance in 2018 and 2019.

His career was put on hold from 2019 to much of 2021 following his assault arrest. He returned to racing in October 2021 in the USAC Silver Crown Series and won in his second race with Kirk Morgan's Morgan Motorsports team. The performance promoted him to a full season with the team in 2022. He also planned to race for that year's SST championship, but a ramp landing in the season opener at the Grand Prix of Long Beach caused him to reaggravate a T4 spinal fracture that he suffered in a sprint car crash in 2017. Although the SST schedule was dropped, he continued his oval racing.

Personal life
In February 2019, Hamilton was arrested in Florida on charges of false imprisonment and aggravated assault after breaking into his ex-girlfriend's hotel room and holding her at knife-point. He had been struggling with concussions for months prior to the incident that he sustained in race crashes. Hamilton was sentenced to five years of probation. While his driving career was on hiatus, he started a series of businesses and became an ambassador for the Brian Hamilton Foundation, which helps those with criminal records become entrepreneurs.

Racing record

American Open-Wheel racing results
(key) (Races in bold indicate pole position, races in italics indicate fastest race lap)

Indy Lights

Stadium Super Trucks
(key) (Bold – Pole position. Italics – Fastest qualifier. * – Most laps led.)

1 Although Hamilton led the most laps, his disqualification resulted in the bonus points being awarded to Bill Hynes.

NASCAR
(key) (Bold – Pole position awarded by qualifying time. Italics – Pole position earned by points standings or practice time. * – Most laps led.)

K&N Pro Series West

References

External links
 

Racing drivers from Idaho
Indy Lights drivers
Stadium Super Trucks drivers
1997 births
Living people
People from Star, Idaho
NASCAR drivers
USAC Silver Crown Series drivers
Team Pelfrey drivers